Benena is a small town and commune in the Tominian Cercle in the Ségou Region of southern Mali. In 1998 the commune had a population of 14,748.

References

Communes of Ségou Region
Burkina Faso–Mali border crossings